Federal Highway 61 (Carretera Federal 61) (Fed. 61) is a free (libre) part of the federal highway corridors (los corredores carreteros federales) of Mexico, connecting Acámbaro, Guanajuato to Maravatío, Michoacán.

References

061